The Yakutian (Sakha ata) or Yakut is a native horse breed from the Siberian Sakha Republic (or Yakutia) region. It is large compared to the otherwise similar Mongolian horse and Przewalski's horse. It is noted for its adaptation to the extreme cold climate of Yakutia, including the ability to locate and graze on vegetation that is under deep snow cover, and to survive without shelter in temperatures that reach .

The horses appear to have evolved from domesticated horses brought with the Yakuts when they migrated to the area beginning in the 13th century, and are not descended from wild horses known to inhabit the area in Neolithic times.

Varieties and characteristics 

There are several subtypes of the Yakutian horse. The Northern type is the purest bred Yakut, and is sometimes called the Middle Kolyma or Verkhoyansk horse. It is usually bay, gray or light dun in color, with primitive markings including a dark dorsal stripe and zebra-pattern stripes on the legs. This variety is considered to be the most valuable. The second variety is the Smaller Southern type, which is also considered a pure but less valuable breed. The third variety is the Larger Southern type, which is the result of cross-breeding with other breeds, and is widespread in central Yakutia.

Adaption to the Siberian environment 

In Siberia, annual temperatures fluctuate between +38 and −70 °C (+100 and −94 °F) and winter may last for 8 months.  Yakutian horses are kept unstabled year-round, and in the roughly 800 years that they have been present in Siberia, they have evolved a range of remarkable morphologic, metabolic and physiologic adaptions to this harsh environment.
 While smaller than modern highly derived horse breeds, they are larger than other primitive horse breeds (Bergmann's rule); at the same time they have a compact build with a stouter trunk and legs that are relatively short in proportion to the horse's size (Allen's rule).
 Their metabolism adjusts to seasonal needs.  In fall they accumulate large fat reserves, in winter the metabolic rate is lowered, and in spring they show an increased carbohydrate metabolism, making use of the freshly sprouting grass.
 They show an increased production of antifreezing compounds.
 They may further avoid frostbite by reducing the volume of circulating blood during times of extreme cold, as indicated by an increased responsiveness of their genetic networks involved in oxidative stress responses, vasodilation, and blood coagulation.
Genetically they show indications of convergent evolution with other inhabitants of the Far North like mammoths regarding their adaption to the extreme cold.

Uses 
The Yakutian horse is used primarily for its meat, which is considered a delicacy by locals due to a plentiful fat layer. Their milk is also used, mostly for making Kumis. Despite their small stature, the Yakut is valued for its riding capabilities.

See also 
 Yakutian cattle
 Yakutian Laika

References

External links 
 

horse
Horse breeds
Horse breeds originating in Russia
Sakha Republic